The Dutch Women's Volleyball Cup is the top annual women's volleyball cup competition in the Netherlands Started in 1974, Ruled and managed by the Dutch Volleyball Association (NeVoBo), it is contested by clubs from all Divisions first second and third tier. 
The advantages was given to clubs from the 1st tier to advance automatically to the 8 round playoffs.

Competition history

Winners list

References

External links
  Dutch Volleyball Association  

Volleyball in the Netherlands